Dandakharka may refer to:

Dandakharka, Janakpur, Nepal
Dandakharka, Narayani, Nepal